Lexi Randall (born January 1, 1980) is a former child actor in films and television. She appeared in the film The Long Walk Home and The War with Kevin Costner and Elijah Wood.  Randall starred in the three television movies made from the novel Sarah, Plain and Tall. She also was in a starring role, “In the Best Interest of the Children”  and was a recurring character in the television series Designing Women as Randa Oliver .

Filmography

Film

Television

References

External links
 

1980 births
Actresses from Houston
American child actresses
American film actresses
American television actresses
Living people
20th-century American actresses
21st-century American women